Gulmarg, known as Gulmarag in Kashmiri, is a town, hill station, popular tourist destination, popular skiing destination and a notified area committee in the Baramulla district in the Indian union territory of Jammu and Kashmir. The town is situated in the Pir Panjal Range in the Western Himalayas and lies within the boundaries of Gulmarg Wildlife Sanctuary.

Etymology
Kashmir has many summer retreats suffixed with the word -marg: Sonamarg, Tangmarg, Gulmarg, Khilanmarg, Youmarg, and Nagmarg. Gulmarg is one of the Margs that has historical importance for Kashmiris.

Gulmarg is a compound word or portmanteau of two Persian words Gul and Marg. Gul means flowers and Marg means meadow. So, Gulmarg is a meadow of flowers. The credit for discovering the charms of Gulmarg first time in history has been given to Yousuf Shah Chak, the last Chak ruler who reigned from 1579 to 1586 AD.

History 

Yousuf Shah Chak, who ruled Kashmir from 1579 to 1586, frequented the place with his queen Habba Khatoon and renamed it 'Gulmarg' ("meadow of flowers"). Wild flowers of 21 different varieties were collected by the Mughal emperor Jahangir for his gardens in Gulmarg. In the 19th century, British civil servants started using Gulmarg as a retreat to escape summers in North Indian plains. Hunting and golfing were their favorite pastime and three golf courses were established in Gulmarg including one exclusively for women. In 1927, British established a ski club in Gulmarg and two annual ski events were hosted one each during Christmas and Easter. Central Asian explorer Aurel Stein also visited Gulmarg during this period.

After the end of British rule in India, Gulmarg became a part of the independent princely state of Kashmir and Jammu. Pakistan planned an invasion of the state called Operation Gulmarg. One of the routes used by the invading militia of Pathan tribesmen, armed and supported by Pakistani regular troops, passed through the Haji Pir pass and Gulmarg onto the state capital Srinagar. Gulmarg fell to the invading army, but the Indian army led by the 1 Sikh Regiment, which had been airlifted to Srinagar only after the Dogra ruler of the state Maharaja Hari Singh had signed an Instrument of Accession with India on 26 October 1947, successfully defended the outskirts of Srinagar. Thereafter, Indian counterattacks pushed the tribesmen back and many towns including Gulmarg were recaptured. In 1948, Indian Army established a ski school in Gulmarg which later became the High Altitude Warfare School of the Indian army specializing in snow–craft and winter warfare. On 1 January 1949, the war ended under UN supervision and a Ceasefire line (CFL), which was rechristened the Line of Control (LOC) by the Shimla Agreement of 1972, came into being close to Gulmarg.

After Indian Independence, Indian planners sought to develop a destination for Winter sports in India. The Department of Tourism of the Government of India invited Rudolph Matt, in 1960 to select a suitable location for such purpose. Matt zeroed in on Gulmarg as a suitable location for the development of a winter sports destination in India. In 1968, the Institute of Skiing and Mountaineering was established in Gulmarg to train ski instructors. Over the next decade, Indian planners invested  to transform Gulmarg into a world-class ski destination. Gulmarg became a centre for skiers from Asian nations. In mid-1980s, heli-skiing was introduced in Gulmarg in collaboration with the Swiss skier Sylvain Saudan of Himalaya Heli-Ski Club of France.
In the 1990s, the rise of militancy in Jammu and Kashmir affected tourism in Gulmarg. With the abatement of terrorism in the area, tourism started to recover in late 1990s. Work on the cable car project between Gulmarg and Apharwat Peak, which was commissioned in 1988 by Government of Jammu and Kashmir but was subsequently abandoned due to militancy in 1990, was resumed in 1998. In May 1998, Phase 1 of the project, between Gulmarg and Kongdori, began its commercial operation. In May 2005, Phase 2 of the project was also inaugurated, making it one of the longest and highest ropeways of Asia. The chairlift installed as a part of Phase 3 of the project began its operations in 2011. The National Winter Games were held in Gulmarg in 1998, 2004 and 2008. In 2014, Government of Jammu and Kashmir drafted a Master Plan–2032 for Gulmarg. The plan includes development of a solid-waste treatment plant on 20 acres of land close to Gulmarg.

Geology and geography
The soil in Gulmarg comprises glacial deposits, lacustrine deposits and moraines of Pleistocene age covering shales, limestones, sandstones, schists and other varieties of rocks. The natural meadows of Gulmarg, which are covered with snow in winter, allow the growth of wild flowers such as daisies, forget-me-nots and buttercups during spring and summer. The meadows are interspersed by enclosed parks and small lakes, and surrounded by forests of green pine and fir. Many points on Apharwat peak and Khilanmarg offer a panoramic view of Nanga Parbat and Harmukh mountains.

Climate 
Due to its high elevation, Gulmarg has a humid continental climate where the wet winter season sees heavy snowfall, especially for its latitude. Summers are moderate in temperature and length, whereas shoulder seasons are relatively cool.

Demographics 

At the 2011 Indian census, Gulmarg had a total population of 1,965 over 77 households. The male population in the town stood at 1,957 while there were only eight females and no children between the ages of 0 and 6 years. Gulmarg had an average literacy rate of 99.24%, compared to the state average of 67.16%, of which male literacy was 99.23% and female literacy was 100%. Scheduled Castes and Scheduled Tribes constituted 0.61% and 0.15% of the population respectively. Gulmarg has few permanent residents with most residents being tourists or those involved in the tourism industry.

Tourism 

According to CNN, Gulmarg is the "heartland of winter sports in India" and was rated as Asia's seventh best ski destination. The town is accessible from Srinagar by road via Tangmarg.
The road climbs uphill in the last 12 kilometres to Gulmarg passing through forests of pine and fir. Winter sports like skiing, tobogganing, snowboarding and heli-skiing take place on the slopes of Mount Apharwat reachable by a Gondola lift.

Gulmarg Gondola 

Built by the French company Pomagalski, the Gulmarg Gondola is one of the highest in the world reaching 3,979 metres. The two-stage ropeway ferries about 600 people per hour between Gulmarg and a shoulder of nearby Apharwat Peak. A chair lift system connects Kongdoori with Mary's shoulder for taking skiers to higher altitudes. The high inflow of tourists has had an effect on the fragile eco-system of Gulmarg and activists have demanded tighter regulation to save the environment of the area from over-tourism.

An accident occurred on 15 June 2017 due to an enormous pine tree being uprooted by a gust of wind and breaking the perspex windows on one of the gondola cabins, causing it to swing violently and its seven occupants to fall  to the ground.

Igloo cafe and Igloo restaurant
In February 2022, the World's largest igloo cafe was opened in Gulmarg. It was made with a height of 37.5 feet and a diameter of 44.5 feet. Around 40 people can eat there at a time. In 2023, a glass igloo restaurant was developed by Kolahoi Green Heights, a hotel in Gulmarg.

Maharani Temple

Maharani Temple (commonly known as Shiv Temple of Gulmarg) was built by a Hindu ruler Maharaja Hari Singh for his wife Maharani Mohini Bai Sisodia who ruled till 1915. This temple was considered as the stately possession of Dogra kings. The temple is dedicated to Shiva and Parvati. This temple is situated on a slight hilltop with greenery. This temple is visible from all corners of Gulmarg.

Maharaja Palace at Gulmarg
The 8700 sq ft Palace was built by Maharaja Hari Singh in early 19th century.

St Mary's Church

The St Mary's Church is located in the valley of Shepherds in Gulmarg.
It was built in 1902, during the period of British rule, and was constructed in a British style. Made of grey brick with a green roof and decorated wooden interior walls, it has been described as a "Victorian architectural wonder".
In 1920 the church saw the wedding of the brother of Bruce Bairnsfather; Miss Eleanor Hardy Tipping married Capt. T. D. Bairnsfather, with newspapers describing the church as "very prettily decorated" and with the service conducted by Rev Canon Buckwell in the presence of both organ and a full choir.

St Mary's was closed for years but was renovated and reopened in 2003, holding its first Christmas service there for 14 years. The church belongs to the Diocese of Amritsar, Church Of North India.

High Altitude Warfare School
In 1948, the Indian Army established a ski school in Gulmarg that later became the High Altitude Warfare School, which specializes in snow–craft and winter warfare. It is located in an area which is prone to avalanches.

Sport

Gulmarg Winter Games 2020 
The first-ever Khelo India Winter Games were held from 7 March at Gulmarg in Jammu and Kashmir. Around 955 participants took part in the 5-day event. Organised by Jammu and Kashmir Sports Council in collaboration Union Ministry of Youth Affairs and Sports, the Games included various sports disciplines at the ski resort of Gulmarg in north Kashmir from 7 to 11 March.

Golf course
Situated at an altitude of 2,650 m, it is the highest green golf course in the world. The historic Gulmarg Golf Club was started in 1911 by the British who used the place as a holiday resort. The origin of Gulmarg as the golfing centre of India goes back to the late 19th century when a 6-hole course was made in 1890-91 by Colonel Neville Chamberlain. The first golf championship was played at Gulmarg in 1922. The Nedou's Cup was introduced in 1929.

Avalanche information center
In 2008 an American avalanche forecaster named Brian Newman began an NPO named Gulmarg Avalanche Center.  The purpose of this organization was to dispense daily avalanche risk bulletins to visitors entering the unmanaged backcountry surrounding the Gulmarg ski area.  The centre provides avalanche education including a free weekly avalanche awareness talk during the winter season.

Events 
An annual three-day Gulmarg Winter Festival is held in March. Budding artists in the fields of music, films and photography are given an opportunity to showcase their work during the festival.

Gulmarg in Bollywood
Gulmarg has been the shooting location many Bollywood films like Bobby, Aap Ki Kasam, Jab Tak Hai Jaan, Yeh Jawaani Hai Deewani, Highway, Phantom, Haider, etc.

See also
 Dal lake
 Peer Ki Gali
 Aharbal
 Gangabal
 Kokernag
 Dachigam National Park
 Sonamarg
 Verinag
 Indira Gandhi Memorial Tulip Garden
 Kausar Nag
 Zabarwan Range
 Sheikh ul-Alam International Airport
 Jammu-Baramulla line
 Mughal Road
 Kolahoi Peak
 Martand Sun Temple
 Amarnath Cave
 Chiranbal
 Kashmir Railway
 Kheer Bhawani
 Pahalgam
 Gurez
 Tanmarg Drung Waterfall

References 

Ski areas and resorts in India
Hill stations in Jammu and Kashmir
Tourism in Jammu and Kashmir
Cities and towns in Baramulla district